Peter Bastiansen may refer to:

Peter Bastiansen (politician) (1912–1995), Norwegian communist politician
Peter Bastiansen (tennis) (born 1962), Danish professional tennis player